John Hillhouse (14 January 1898 – 8 October 1972) was a Scottish footballer who played in the English Football League as a wing half for Rochdale and Notts County, as well as non-league football for a number of other teams. In his native Scotland, his clubs included Nithsdale Wanderers and Arthurlie. His cousins Willie and Hugh, who grew up on the same street in Hurlford, were also footballers.

References

Rochdale A.F.C. players
Notts County F.C. players
Middlesbrough F.C. players
Bury F.C. players
Hurlford United F.C. players
Solway Star F.C. players
Nithsdale Wanderers F.C. players
Workington A.F.C. players
Arthurlie F.C. players
Scottish footballers
Footballers from East Ayrshire
Association football wing halves
1898 births
1972 deaths
Scottish Football League players
English Football League players